Zhigulevsk is a town in Samara Oblast, Russia, located on the right bank of the Volga River in the Samara Bend near the Zhiguli Mountains,  west of Samara. Population:

Etymology
The name Zhigulevsk is taken from the Zhiguli Mountains, but they are named for an earlier settlement of Zhigulevka, itself probably named for an early inhabitant, Zhegul.

History
The town occupies the territories of former villages of Otvazhnoye (known since 1840) and Morkvashi (known since 1647). The work settlement of Otvazhny was built here to develop the oil deposits. In 1949, it was merged with the villages and renamed Zhigulevsk. It was granted town status in 1952.

Administrative and municipal status
Within the framework of administrative divisions, it is, together with five rural localities, incorporated as the town of oblast significance of Zhigulevsk—an administrative unit with the status equal to that of the districts. As a municipal division, the town of oblast significance of Zhigulevsk is incorporated as Zhigulevsk urban okrug.

Economy
Besides oil, the town also develops limestone deposits.

References

Notes

Sources

External links

Official website of Zhigulevsk 
Zhigulyovsk Business Directory 

Cities and towns in Samara Oblast
Populated places established in 1949
1949 establishments in Russia